Kelvin Edward Felix, OBE, SLMH, DAH (born 15 February 1933) is the Roman Catholic Archbishop emeritus of Castries. He was born in Roseau, Dominica, on 15 February 1933. He became a cardinal at the papal consistory held on 22 February 2014.

Youth and early clerical career
Felix was born in Dominica and ordained a priest on 8 April 1956. In 1962 he left the West Indies for St. Francis Xavier University in Nova Scotia, where he attained a Diploma in Adult Education in 1963, gained a master's degree from the University of Notre Dame in Indiana in Sociology and Anthropology in 1967 and completed post graduate studies in Sociology at the University of Bradford in England in 1970. He was the Principal of the Roman Catholic High School in Dominica from 1972 to 1975 and Associate General Secretary of the Caribbean Conference of Churches from 1975 to 1981.

Archbishop of Castries
Felix was consecrated archbishop on 5 October 1981 and served as President of the Antilles Episcopal Conference from 1991 to 1997 and President of the Caribbean Conference of Churches from 1981 to 1986. He is now a member of the Roman Curia. The Province of Castries, of which Archbishop Felix was the Metropolitan, includes St. George's-in-Grenada, Roseau, Dominica, and St. John's-Basseterre, Antigua/St. Kitts. The Diocese of Kingstown was suffragan of the Archdiocese of Castries until 2011 when it was transferred to the Metropolitan Archdiocese of Port of Spain. In addition to the administration of the Catholic Church in St. Lucia, Archbishop Felix was responsible for 33 primary schools, two secondary schools, one girls' vocational school, two homes for the elderly, one shelter for the homeless and an orphanage for young children.

On 12 April 2006, Felix was attacked and grabbed on the neck by a man with a knife, as soon as he finished an evening sermon at the Cathedral Basilica of the Immaculate Conception in Castries. The man ran after Felix was aware of a sawing motion on his throat, and then pushed him backwards. News of the event made Saint Lucian natives reminiscent of a similar attack at the same Cathedral on New Year's Eve, 2000, in which a nun was killed and another injured.

As he approached his retirement age, Felix requested of the Vatican that a co-adjutor archbishop be appointed to ensure a smooth transition in the Archdiocese. On 19 July 2007, Bishop Robert Rivas of the Diocese of Kingstown as Co-adjutor Archbishop of the Diocese of Castries. His installation was held on 14 October 2007. Since his retirement, he has returned to his native Dominica, where he assists in smaller parishes.

Cardinal
Pope Francis made Felix a cardinal on 22 February 2014 for his service to the church. He is the Cardinal-Priest of Santa Maria della Salute a Primavalle.

Distinctions 
The Archbishop was awarded an Honorary Doctorate of Laws in 1986 from St. Francis Xavier University, Nova Scotia and was appointed an Order of the British Empire by Queen Elizabeth II in 1992. In 1999, he was awarded Dominica's highest honour, the Dominica Award of Honour for Meritorious Service by the Government of the Commonwealth of Dominica. In 2002 he received the Medal of Honour (Gold) (SLMH) of the Order of St. Lucia for services to Religion from the Government of St. Lucia on occasion of the 23rd anniversary of the country's independence for having rendered eminent service of national importance to Saint Lucia.

See also
Cardinals created by Francis

References

External links

 
Kelvin Edward Felix
Biography available in  Archbishops of Castries

 

|-
 

1933 births
Living people
Saint Lucian Roman Catholic archbishops
20th-century Roman Catholic archbishops in the Caribbean
21st-century Roman Catholic archbishops in the Caribbean
Dominica emigrants to Saint Lucia
Notre Dame College of Arts and Letters alumni
Alumni of the University of Bradford
Cardinals created by Pope Francis
Saint Lucian cardinals
Dominica cardinals
Roman Catholic archbishops of Castries